refers to a residence of the Empress Dowager of Japan. Literally, Ōmiya means Large Palace, but it is also a courtesy title of the Empress Dowager. Thus, the name Ōmiya Palace does not refer to any specific place, such as Ōmiya-ku, Saitama. 
In the modern history, there are three palaces called Ōmiya Palace:
 , or simply Ōmiya Palace, in Kyoto was built in 1867 as the residence of Empress Eishō, the spouse of Emperor Kōmei. The palace is now used as a lodging for the imperial family and state guests.
  in Akasaka, Minato, Tokyo was the residence of Empress Teimei, the spouse of Emperor Taishō. After her death at the palace in 1951, the site of the palace was converted to the Crown Prince's residence Tōgū Palace which is now used by Emperor Naruhito and his family. 
  in the Kōkyo in Tokyo was originally the residence of Emperor Shōwa and Empress Kōjun and was called Fukiage Palace. After the Emperor's death in 1989, the palace was renamed Fukiage Ōmiya Palace where the Empress Dowager lived until her death in 2000.

References

See also
 List of palaces
 Imperial House of Japan
 Japanese empresses

Imperial residences in Japan
Palaces in Tokyo
Buildings and structures in Kyoto
Former palaces in Japan